Vikublaðið is a free Faroese weekly newspaper.  In a national survey, it came out as the most read newspaper on the islands.

External links
 
 Vikublaðið online (Calaméo)

Publications with year of establishment missing
Newspapers published in the Faroe Islands